= Terraconia =

Scientific classification
- Kingdom: Animalia
- Phylum: Mollusca
- Class: Gastropoda
- Subclass: Caenogastropoda
- Order: Littorinimorpha
- Family: Hydrobiidae
- Genus: Terraconia; Ramos, Arconada, Rolan & Moreno, 2000

Genus of gastropods

Terraconia is a genus of very small freshwater snails with an operculum, aquatic gastropod mollusks in the family Hydrobiidae.

== Species ==
Species within the genus Terraconia include:

- Terraconia rolani Ramos, Arconada, Rolan & Moreno, 2000
