= Terraconia rolani =

Scientific classification
- Kingdom: Animalia
- Phylum: Mollusca
- Class: Gastropoda
- Subclass: Caenogastropoda
- Order: Littorinimorpha
- Family: Hydrobiidae
- Genus: Terraconia
- Species: T. rolani

Binomial name
- Terraconia rolani Ramos, Arconada, Rolan & Moreno, 2000

Species of gastropod

Terraconia rolani is a species of very small or minute freshwater snail with an operculum, an aquatic gastropod mollusk in the family Hydrobiidae.
